Nancy Ellen Cantor (born April 2, 1952) is an American academic administrator and the chancellor of Rutgers University-Newark, in Newark, New Jersey. A social psychologist, Cantor is recognized for her scholarly contributions to the understanding of how individuals perceive and think about their social worlds, pursue personal goals, and how they regulate their behavior to adapt to life's most challenging social environments. Previously, Cantor was the first woman chancellor at Syracuse University. Prior to that she was the first woman chancellor at the University of Illinois at Urbana-Champaign. Earlier, she had been provost at the University of Michigan.

Early life and education
Cantor was born in New York City.  She received her A.B. in 1974 from Sarah Lawrence College and her Ph.D. in psychology in 1978 from Stanford University.  At Stanford, Cantor initiated a program of research on person prototypes with Walter Mischel inspired by the categorization research of Eleanor Rosch and Carolyn Mervis.

Career

Cantor is widely recognized for helping forge a new understanding of the role of universities in society that re-emphasizes their public mission.

Early career

Early in her career, Cantor held teaching positions at the University of Michigan and Princeton University. As an academic administrator, she served as provost and executive vice president for academic affairs at the University of Michigan and then chancellor of the University of Illinois at Urbana-Champaign.

Syracuse University
In 2004, Cantor was selected chancellor of Syracuse University. The university's board of trustees judged her initial five years to be very successful, pointing to her work with students, faculty and staff that leveraged the university's historic strengths, fostered innovation and creativity, and connected the institution in profound ways with the community, all of which has increased the university's quality and national visibility. The board's then-chair stated, “The board’s confidence in Nancy is affirmed by numerous external accolades — from the exceptional report on SU recently completed by the Middle States Commission on Higher Education to her receipt last week of the Carnegie Corporation’s prestigious Academic Leadership Award. The University is fortunate to have a leader of Nancy’s caliber. We are delighted that we were able to secure Nancy as Chancellor and proud that she has made a long-term commitment to the University."

Upon her departure nine years, later, she was credited by the chair of the university's board of trustees with having been a superlative leader and making unprecedented advancements at Syracuse. 

"The Rutgers-Newark campus and community are gaining one of the nation’s outstanding academic leaders and the Rutgers board is gaining a deeply thoughtful, energetic and committed partner...Nancy has been a superlative leader, seeing our University to wonderful success and helping us to build on our distinctive greatness and achieve new heights. Among her many achievements, she led us through an aggressive and successful $1 billion capital campaign, positioned us in ways that have resulted in a record level of applications from an applicant pool that is more diverse than ever, attracted hundreds of new faculty, overseen the creation of a stellar array of new academic facilities, and engaged our city and community in unprecedented ways."--Richard L. Thompson

She was among the early university leaders nationally to point to the dubious role of popular press rankings of colleges and universities. 

In 2006, following a series of racially discriminatory incidents at the student-run TV station HillTV, she halted its production so that a university panel could review the circumstances and consider disciplinary action. A small percentage of faculty signed an open letter protesting the move and her decision. Ultimately, by a university panel allowed the station to re-open under close monitoring and remedial plan.

Cantor headed a major fundraising campaign at Syracuse and was responsible for the development of the university’s Scholarship in Action initiative, which emphasized the role of the university as a public good. The Connective Corridor was the physical part of Scholarship in Action that aimed to bridge gaps between a wealthy university and a surrounding struggling city. This includes the university's having been named among the first institutions to earn the Carnegie Foundation for the Advancement of Teaching's classification as a university committed to Community Engagement, and the Carnegie Corporation of New York's having granted Cantor the 2008 Carnegie Corporation Academic Leadership Award. Scholarship in Action was both popular and divisive at the same time.

Rutgers-Newark
In 2014, Cantor left Syracuse and took a position as chancellor of Rutgers University–Newark.

Boards
Among the boards of which Cantor is a member are the American Institutes for Research, the New York Academy of Sciences, Rensselaer Polytechnic Institute, and Say Yes to Education, in addition to being past chair of the board of directors of the American Association for Higher Education and 2006 chair of the board of the American Council on Education (ACE). She is an Honorary Trustee of the American Psychological Foundation and was national co-chair of Imagining America's Tenure Team Initiative. She served as co-chair of the Central New York Regional Economic Development Council, a post to which she was appointed by New York Governor Andrew Cuomo in 2011.

Awards
Cantor is a Fellow of the American Academy of Arts and Sciences and a member of the Institute of Medicine of the National Academy of Sciences. She was the 1985 recipient of the American Psychological Association Award for Distinguished Scientific Early Career Contributions in the area of personality psychology.  Her award citation emphasized her contributions to the study of social categorization, specifically, how concepts are structured in terms of probabilities as fuzzy sets.  Other awards include the Woman of Achievement Award from the Anti-Defamation League, the Making a Difference for Women Award from the National Council for Research on Women, the Reginald Wilson Diversity Leadership Award from the American Council on Education, and the Frank W. Hale, Jr. Diversity Leadership Award from the National Association of Diversity Officers in Higher Education.

Personal life
Cantor is married to sociology professor Steven R. Brechin, who teaches at Rutgers University-New Brunswick.

References

External links

Syracuse University - About Chancellor Cantor

American social psychologists
American women psychologists
Sarah Lawrence College alumni
Stanford University alumni
Presidents of Syracuse University
Leaders of the University of Illinois
Rutgers University–Newark faculty
University of Michigan staff
Living people
1952 births
Women heads of universities and colleges
21st-century American women
Members of the National Academy of Medicine